The Castle Hayne Limestone (also called the Castle Hayne Formation) is a geologic formation in North Carolina. It consists of cobble to pebble sized clasts, usually rounded, coated with phosphate and glauconite in a limestone matrix. The Castle Hayne Limestone is known for containing fossils dating back to the Paleogene period. It preserves many of North Carolina's renowned Eocene fossils. It is named after the locality of Castle Hayne in New Hanover county, though the formation itself stretches over several counties.

Description 

The Castle Hayne Formation is divided into three submembers: the New Hanover member, the Comfort Member, and the Spring Garden Member. The New Hanover member is the oldest member and is characterizes by cobbles and pebbles, fine sand, glauconite, and phosphate in a fine limestone matrix. The most common fossils are shark and ray teeth. Index fossils place this member in the middle Eocene. The Comfort member lies above the New Hanover member. It contains bryozoa and sea urchin fossils and beds of glauconite and phosphate pebbles that mark breaks in deposition. The Comfort member was deposited in the late middle Eocene and is overlain by the Spring Garden member. The Spring Garden member is a siliceous rock cemented with calcite and containing detrital phosphate. Mollusc bivalves account for up to 75% of the composition in some areas and molds of molluscs shells filled with silica are common. Index fossils indicate this member was also deposited in the late middle Eocene.

Fossils

Invertebrates

Molluscs

Cephalopods

Vertebrates Fossils

Mammals

Cetaceans

Sirenians

Cingulates

Reptiles

Squamates

Turtles

Crocodilians

See also

 List of fossiliferous stratigraphic units in North Carolina

References

 

Limestone formations of the United States
Paleogene geology of North Carolina